The UK Singles Chart is the official chart for the United Kingdom of singles. The chart is compiled by the Official Charts Company and the beginning of an "official" singles chart is generally regarded as February 1969 when the British Market Research Bureau (BMRB) was formed to compile the chart in a joint venture between the BBC and Record Retailer. Charts were used to measure the popularity of music and, initially, were based on sheet music. In 1952, NME imitated an American idea from Billboard magazine and began compiling a chart based on physical sales of the release. Rival publications such as Record Mirror, Melody Maker, Disc began to compile their own charts in the mid-to-late 1960s. Trade paper Record Retailer compiled its first chart in March 1960.

This list covers the period from the start-up of the BMRB in February 1969 to the last independently compiled charts of NME and Melody Maker in May 1988 (after which both published the Market Research Information Bureau chart). This period includes the point at which compilation of the UK Singles Chart was taken over by Gallup in January 1983.

During these 19 years, there were a total of 343 canonical number-ones, plus an additional 149 that are not recognised by the Official Charts Company. From 1969 to 1971, the figure also included additional number-ones from Top Pops (which changed its name to Music Now in 1970); in 1969, six of the non-canonical number-ones only reached the top of their charts, a figure that would never be repeated. 36 non-canonical number-ones only made the top of NMEs charts, while Melody Maker had 44 stand-alone number-ones. Eleven of the number-ones in the Official Charts' canon did not make the top of any of the other charts.

Notable differences between the canonical and non-canonical charts include the Christmas 1980 season, when NME and Melody Maker had Jona Lewie's "Stop the Cavalry at number-one while the canonical seasonal number-one was "There's No One Quite Like Grandma" by St Winifred's School Choir. One of the more controversial instances of the BMRB era involved the Sex Pistols' anti-monarchy single "God Save the Queen," which NME had at number-one during the Silver Jubilee of Elizabeth II. The single, released by Virgin Records, was the highest-selling single of the week but had been banned by the BBC and some major retailers. To prevent it from reaching the top of the BMRB chart, for one-week compilers "decreed that shops which sold their own records could not have those records represented in the chart", thus sales from Virgin Megastores were not counted. Despite reaching number-two on the official chart, it is sometimes referred to as reaching number one. However, "God Save the Queen" reached no higher than number five on the Melody Maker chart.

Main charts

British Market Research Bureau (BMRB)

On 15 February 1969, the BMRB was commissioned in a joint venture by the BBC and Record Retailer to compile the singles and album charts. BMRB compiled the first chart from postal returns of sales logs from 250 record shops. The sampling cost approximately £52,000 and shops were randomly chosen and submitted figures for sales taken up to the close of trade on Saturday. The data was compiled on Monday and given to the BBC on Tuesday to be announced on Johnnie Walker's afternoon show and later published in Record Retailer (rebranded Music Week in 1972). However, the BMRB often struggled to have the full sample of sales figures returned by post. The 1971 postal strike meant that data had to be collected by telephone but this was deemed inadequate for a national chart, and by 1973 the BMRB was using motorcycle couriers to collect sales figures. A World in Action documentary exposé in 1980 revealed corruption within the industry; stores' chart-returns dealers would frequently be offered bribes to falsify sales logs.

New Musical Express (NME)

The New Musical Express (NME) chart was the first in the United Kingdom to gauge musics' popularity by physical sales – previously sheet music sales were used. NMEs co-founder Percy Dickins imitated the chart produced by American Billboard magazine and began to compile Britain's first hit parade in 1952. Other periodicals produced their own charts and The Official Charts Company and Guinness' British Hit Singles & Albums regard NME as the canonical British singles chart until 10 March 1960. After this Record Retailer is regarded as the canonical source until February 1969, when the BMRB was formed. However, during the 1960s NME had the biggest circulation of charts in the decade and was the most widely followed.

After 1969, NME continued to compile charts in the 1970s and 1980s and ended its time as the longest running independently compiled in May 1988.

Melody Maker

Melody Maker compiled its own chart from 1956 until 1988 which was used by many national newspapers. It was the third periodical to compile a chart and rivaled existing compilers NME and Record Mirror. Melody Makers chart, like NMEs, was based on a telephone poll of record stores. Melody Maker compiled a Top 20 for its first chart using figures from 19 shops on 7 April 1956. During the 1950s, sample sizes ranged from around 14–33 shops and on 30 July 1960 the phoning of record shops was supplemented with postal returns; the first chart to use this method sampled 38 stores from 110 returns. On 26 August 1967, Disc, owned by the same company as Melody Maker, stopped compiling their own chart and started using the Melody Maker chart. In its 9 February 1963 edition, Melody Maker disclosed that it received chart returns from 245 retailers and that its chart was audited by auditors supplied by Middlesex County Council. By the end of 1969, however, with the establishment of the BMRB, Melody Maker and NME had reduced their sample pool to 100 stores.

Top Pops

Top Pops was founded initially as a monthly publication in May 1967. In May 1968 it began compiling a chart based on the telephone sample of 12 W H Smith & Son stores. The charts and paper became weekly the following month. Rebranded Music Now by 1970, the chart and paper ceased publication the following year.

Gallup

On 4 January 1983, compilation of the UK single and album charts was taken over by Gallup who began the introduction of computerised tills which automated the data collection process. The chart was based entirely on sales of physical singles from retail outlets and announced on Tuesday until October 1987, when the Top 40 was revealed each Sunday, due to the new automated process. Gallup would continue to compile the single and album charts for a few more years past the elimination of NME and Melody Makers independently compiled charts after the 14 May 1988 issues and their switching starting the next week to charts compiled by the Market Research Information Bureau., until 30 June 1990 when the British Phonographic Industry (BPI) terminated its contract with them and switched to a new entity, Chart Information Network, which would change its name to The Official UK Charts Company in November 2001.

Comparison of chart number-ones (1969–1988)

The canonical sources referred to above are BMRB for number ones 266–512 and Gallup for number ones 512–608
Edit by chart considered the canonical source: BMRB •
Gallup

Notes

References
Footnotes

Sources

Lists of number-one songs in the United Kingdom
1960s in British music
1970s in British music
1980s in British music